The Sidewalks of New York: Tin Pan Alley is an album by pianist Uri Caine which was released on the Winter & Winter label in 1999.

Reception

In his review for Allmusic, Ken Dryden notes that "Pianist Uri Caine's work is always intriguing, but this CD is something very different. Sidewalks of New York comes off like the soundtrack to an as yet unmade documentary about Tin Pan Alley at the turn of the century, complete with sound effects of horses and people on the street, folks celebrating in a rowdy saloon, and so on". On All About Jazz C. Michael Bailey said "The Sidewalks of New York is an impressionistic documentary of late 19th and early 20th century popular music. Not music of the 1920s, the music of the pre −1920s. Each piece flows into the next, often with the background of street and bar noises, all providing a ambiance of a bustling city's life".

Track listing
 "Overture: The Sidewalks of New York/I Wonder Who's Kissing Her Now" (James W. Blake, Charles B. Lawlor/Joseph E. Howard, Harold Orlob, Will M. Hough, Frank R. Adams) – 2:27	
 "Too Much Mustard" (Cecil Macklin) – 2:40
 'Has Anybody Here Seen Kelly?" (Clarence Wainwright Murphy, Will Letters) – 2:32
 "Life's a Very Funny Proposition After All" (George M. Cohan) – 4:04
 "Sidewalk Story: Daisy Bell/My Wild Irish Rose" (Harry Dacre/Chauncey Olcott) – 3:51
 "Charleston Rag" (Eubie Blake) – 2:08
 "Take Me Out to the Ball Game" (Jack Norworth, Albert Von Tilzer) – 1:49
 "Everybody's Doin' It" (Irving Berlin) – 1:32
 "How'd You Like to Spoon with Me?" (Jerome Kern, Edward Laska) – 1:44
 "Cohen Owes Me Ninety Seven Dollars" (Berlin) – 3:37
 "By the Light of the Silvery Moon" (Gus Edwards, Edward Madden) – 3:20
 "Nobody" (Bert Williams, Alex Rogers) – 4:11
 "Waiting for the Robert E. Lee" (L. Wolfe Gilbert, Lewis F. Muir) – 1:18
 "Interlude: The Sidewalks of New York" (Blake, Lawlor) – 3:46
 "By the Beautiful Sea" (Harry Carroll, Harold R. Atteridge) – 1:48
 "In the Good Old Summertime" (George Evans, Ren Shields) – 1:16
 Some of These Days: The Rehearsal" (Shelton Brooks) – 6:46
 "Some of These Days: The Show" (Brooks) – 4:03
 "Castle Walk" (F. W. Meacham, Ford Dabney) – 2:49
 "They Didn't Believe Me" (Kern, Herbert Reynolds) – 3:41
 "The Memphis Blues" (W. C. Handy, George Norton) – 1:56
 "After the Ball" (Charles K. Harris) – 3:28
 "You're a Grand Old Flag" (Cohan) – 1:23
 "The Bowery" – 4:03
 "When I Leave the World Behind" (Berlin) – 2:34	
 "Finale: The Sidewalks of New York" (Blake, Lawlor) – 3:29
 "Coda: In the Good Old Summertime" (Evans, Shields) – 1:01

Personnel
Uri Caine – piano, vocals
Bob DeBellis – flute
Ralph Alessi (tracks 2, 5, 11, 14, 18 & 23), Dave Douglas (tracks 4, 12 & 22) – trumpet 
Josh Roseman – trombone 
Bob Stewart – tuba
Don Byron – clarinet 
Dominic Cortese – accordion, vocals
Mark Feldman – violin 
Eddy Davis – banjo
James Genus – bass
Ben Perowsky – drums
Barbara Walker (tracks: 17, 18), Brian D’Arcy Jones (tracks: 5), Fay Galperin (tracks: 14), Nancy Anderson (tracks: 20, 22, 24), Nancy Opel (tracks: 3, 8, 11), Philip Hernandez (tracks: 26), Renae Morway-Baker (tracks: 25), Sadiq Bey (tracks: 12, 24), Saul Galperin (tracks: 7, 14), The Sidewalks Of New York Choir, Stuart Zagnit (tracks: 4, 10), Susan Haefner (tracks: 9) – vocals

References

Winter & Winter Records albums
Uri Caine albums
1999 albums